is a river in Hokkaidō, Japan.

Course
Yūbetsu River rises in the Kitami Mountains on the slopes of Mount Tengu.

References

Rivers of Hokkaido
Rivers of Japan